Wang Bojiang (died 9th century BC) was the queen consort of King Yih of Zhou.

She had some influence at court. She managed the economic affairs of the Imperial household, arranged the banquets and rewarded the ministers.

References 

9th-century BC births
9th-century BC deaths
9th-century BC Chinese women
9th-century BC Chinese people
Zhou dynasty consorts